William Lynn may refer to:

 Bill Lynn (baseball) (1921–2000), American baseball player
 Billy Lynn (born 1947), former English professional footballer
 William Henry Lynn (1829–1915), Irish-born architect
 Msgr. William J. Lynn, Roman Catholic official on trial in 2012 in a conspiracy and endangerment/child sex abuse case in Philadelphia
 William J. Lynn III (born 1954), Deputy Secretary of Defense of the United States of America
 William Harkins Lynn (1888–1952), American actor who played Judge Gaffney in Harvey (1950)
 William Michael Lynn, professor at Cornell University's School of Hotel Administration

See also
William Linn (disambiguation)